Johnnie Caldwell Jr. is an American politician from Georgia. He served in the Georgia House of Representatives from 2013 to 2019.

Caldwell previously served on the Fayette County Superior Court, and resigned in 2010 due to the fallout of sexually inappropriate comments and physical contact made to female lawyers. He ran for the Georgia House in 2012, and won, representing the 131st District centered on Thomaston, Georgia. He has won reelection twice. Although he had a challenger in the 2012 Republican primary for his seat, he has never run in a contested general election. Johnnie ran in a contested primary in 2018 against fellow republican, Ken Pullin. Ken went on to win the nomination on May 22, 2018 and took 63 percent of the vote. Ken easily defeated his democratic opponent Chris Benton in his heavily republican district. He succeeded Johnnie Caldwell Jr. on January 14, 2019. Johnnie is currently a private citizen.

Committee assignments
Caldwell served on a number of committees:
 Appropriations
 Banks and Banking
 Insurance
 Judiciary 
 Legislative and Congressional Reapportionment (Chairman) 
 Motor Vehicles
 Rules

Family
His father Johnnie Caldwell Sr. also served in the Georgia House of Representatives, where he also was a key player in the redistricting of the state and the regulation of insurance.

Legislation
In 2017 House session, Caldwell proposed a change to the State Constitution reducing the independence of the Judicial Qualifications Commission that polices the judges. This is the group involved with his resignation from the bench.

Political Rankings
Various political groups have assigned scores to Caldwell based on his votes.

American Conservative Union
 2015 63%
 2014 86%
 2013 70%

References

External links

Living people
Republican Party members of the Georgia House of Representatives
Year of birth missing (living people)